This article lists the results for the China women's national football team between 2000 and 2009.

2000

2001

2002

2003

2004

2005

2006

2007

2008

2009

References

2000–2009
2000s in China
2000 in Chinese football
2001 in Chinese football
2002 in Chinese football
2003 in Chinese football
2004 in Chinese football
2005 in Chinese football
2006 in Chinese football
2007 in Chinese football
2008 in Chinese football
2009 in Chinese football